The Beriev Be-6 (USAF/DoD reporting name "Type 34", NATO reporting name "Madge") was a flying boat produced by the Soviet Beriev OKB. It was capable of accomplishing a wide variety of missions, such as long-range maritime reconnaissance, coastal and supply line patrols, torpedo/bombing strikes, mine-laying, and transport operations.

Design and development
The Be-6 was a gull-winged aircraft with twin oval vertical stabilizers on top of a deep fuselage. The aircraft was of all-metal construction except for fabric covering the rudders and ailerons. The engines were installed in the bends of the wings, with the floats on an underwing cantilever rack. Each float was divided into four watertight compartments.

Operational history

The Be-6 was built from 1949 to 1957 at the Beriev plant in Taganrog. The aircraft had 19 variants through its production cycle, and 123 aircraft were eventually built.
Since requirements of Soviet naval aircraft did not change rapidly, the reliable Be-6 remained in service until the late 1960s. Some aircraft ended service as civilian unarmed transports in Arctic regions. One survivor is preserved at the Ukraine State Aviation Museum in Kiev, Ukraine.
Beriev Be-6s operated by the People's Republic of China PLANAF proved useful in patrolling the long coastline and huge territorial waters off China's coast. During the 1970s the original Shvetsov radial engines began to wear out with no replacements available, so several aircraft were re-engined with WoJiang WJ-6  turboprop engines, in new nacelles, for a new lease of life and were redesignated Qing-6.

Operators

People's Liberation Army Naval Air Force

Soviet Naval Aviation

Variants
 LL-143: Prototype of Be-6 with Shvetsov ASh-72 radial engines; nose, beam, ventral and tail positions for a total of six 12.7mm UBT machine guns. Maiden Flight in March 1945.
 Be-6: standard production aircraft with Shvetsov ASh-73 radial piston engines.
 Qing-6: Be-6 aircraft of the PLANAF re-engined with Dong-an WJ-5 turboprops.

Specifications (Be-6)

See also

References

 Gunston, Bill. “The Osprey Encyclopaedia of Russian Aircraft 1875–1995”. London, Osprey. 1995. 
 Gordon, Yefim & Komissarov, Dmitry. Chinese Aircraft. Hikoki Publications. Manchester. 2008. 

Be-0006
Gull-wing aircraft
Flying boats
1950s Soviet military reconnaissance aircraft
High-wing aircraft
Aircraft first flown in 1949
Twin piston-engined tractor aircraft